Carlos Alberto Galván (born 28 October 1973 in Pontevedra, Buenos Aires) is an Argentine retired footballer who played as a defender and football coach.

Club career
Galván started his career at Racing Club de Avellaneda in 1992, before moving to Brazil in 1998 to play for Clube Atlético Mineiro.

In Brazil he was seen as a skilled defender. His technique was at its best when playing as a sweeper. He scored some key goals. He has a powerful header and sense for positioning.

Among other titles, he won the Minas Gerais state with Atlético Minero. He was also in the Atlético Minero side that were runners-up in the Brazilian Championship in 1999 and with Santos in 2000 when they won the São Paulo State Championship. He played for two years at each team in Brazil. In 1998, with Atlético, he has involved in a fight at Vitória's stadium, where he was one of four players from each side sent off. He also scored an own goal at Vila Belmiro, in a 2-0 defeat against Santos' biggest rivals, Corinthians. He also played for Paysandu, in 2004.

Galván returned to Argentina in 2002 to play for Club Atlético Lanús and in 2004 he had a brief spell with Ciudad de Murcia in Spain. He has also played for Club Olimpia in Paraguay and Argentinos Juniors in Argentina.

In 2007 Galván joined Peruvian team Universitario de Deportes, in February 2009 he announced that he plans to retire in December 2010 to take up a position as a youth coach with the club.

Honours

Club
Atlético Mineiro
Campeonato Mineiro (2): 1999, 2000

Santos FC
Campeonato Brasileiro Série A (1): 2002

Universitario de Deportes
Torneo Apertura 2008 (1): 2008
Primera División Peruana (1): 2009

References

External links
 
  
 

1973 births
Living people
Sportspeople from Buenos Aires Province
Argentine footballers
Association football defenders
Racing Club de Avellaneda footballers
Clube Atlético Mineiro players
Santos FC players
Club Atlético Lanús footballers
Ciudad de Murcia footballers
Argentinos Juniors footballers
Club Olimpia footballers
Club Atlético Banfield footballers
Club Universitario de Deportes footballers
Club Deportivo Universidad César Vallejo footballers
Argentine Primera División players
Peruvian Primera División players
Argentine expatriate footballers
Expatriate footballers in Brazil
Expatriate footballers in Paraguay
Expatriate footballers in Peru
Expatriate footballers in Spain
Universidad Técnica de Cajamarca managers